Hugo Strasser  (April 7, 1922, Munich-Schwabing - March 17, 2016, Munich-Trudering) was a German swing and jazz musician, composer, clarinetist and big band leader of the Orchester Hugo Strasser (Hugo Strasser Orchestra) since 1955. The orchestra was famous for its dance music, in particular music for suited ballroom dancing with its strict beat and tempo, played at numerous ballroom dance / Dancesport championships in Germany and abroad.

Of note is Strasser's series of recordings "Tanzplatte des Jahres" ( "Dance Record of the Year" ).

Selected discography

 Schicke Tanzmusik (1962/63); Modetänze wie Letkiss und Madison)
 Turniertanz-Trümpfe (1963)
 Die Tanzplatte des Jahres (30 items; 1966 bis 1996; since 1982 as digital records, since 1984 also as CD)
 Das Goldene Tanzalbum 1–4 (1967–1968; Part 1: Valencia – Die Goldenen 20er Jahre; Part 2: In the Mood – Melodie und Rhythmus; Part 3: Warum müssen Jahre vergehen – ewig junge Filmschlager; Part 4: Yesterday – Vom Twist zum Beat)
 Das Goldene Hausparty-Album 1–3 (1968)
 Mit Hugo Strasser im 3/4-Takt (1968)
 Tanzweltmeisterschaft 1970 (1970)
 Filmhits zum Tanzen (1970)
 Tanztest-Platte (1971/72)
 Tanzhits ’71 (1972) beat and rock hits
 Romantic Party (1972)
 Olympia-Ball (1972); tracks composed for the 1972 Winter Sapporo and Summer Munich Olympic games
 Swinging Christmas (1973, popular Christmas carols)
 The Dancing Clarinet (1973; Traditional music from around the world in strict tempo)
 Der Goldene Tanzschuh (1974; Opera melodies for dancing) 
 Der Goldene Tanzschuh (1986; Music from the  ZDF program with the same name) 
 Was ich sagen wollte… (1989; Hugo Strasser sings)
 Tanz! Tanz! Tanz! (1990; Peter Kreuder's melodies)
 ARD Masters Gala ’92 (1992)
 So What’s New? Single with Matthias Matuschik and the Bananafishbones (2001)

Filmography
1958: Zwei Matrosen auf der Alm, music
1961: , music
1962: Sfida nella città dell'oro, music
1965: , music

Awards
2012: Bavarian Order of Merit
 2002: Schwabing Art Prize
 1994: Bayerischer Poetentaler

See also
Max Greger
James Last
Paul Kuhn

References

External links

Hugo Strasser in the catalog of the German National Library

1922 births
2016 deaths
German jazz bandleaders
German jazz musicians
German clarinetists
German composers